Psalm 28 is the 28th psalm of the Book of Psalms, beginning in English in the King James Version: "Unto thee will I cry, O LORD my rock;". The Book of Psalms is part of the third section of the Hebrew Bible, and a book of the Christian Old Testament. In the slightly different numbering system used in the Greek Septuagint and Latin Vulgate translations of the Bible, this psalm is Psalm 27. In Latin, it is known by the incipit, "".
 
Psalm 28 is used in both Jewish and Christian liturgies. It has often been set to music.

Text

Hebrew Bible version
Following is the Hebrew text of Psalm 28:

King James Version
 Unto thee will I cry, O LORD my rock; be not silent to me: lest, if thou be silent to me, I become like them that go down into the pit.
 Hear the voice of my supplications, when I cry unto thee, when I lift up my hands toward thy holy oracle.
 Draw me not away with the wicked, and with the workers of iniquity, which speak peace to their neighbours, but mischief is in their hearts.
 Give them according to their deeds, and according to the wickedness of their endeavours: give them after the work of their hands; render to them their desert.
 Because they regard not the works of the LORD, nor the operation of his hands, he shall destroy them, and not build them up.
 Blessed be the LORD, because he hath heard the voice of my supplications.
 The LORD is my strength and my shield; my heart trusted in him, and I am helped: therefore my heart greatly rejoiceth; and with my song will I praise him.
 The LORD is their strength, and he is the saving strength of his anointed.
 Save thy people, and bless thine inheritance: feed them also, and lift them up for ever.

Interpretation 
Charles and Emilie Briggs describe the psalm as 

The Briggs suggest that it is to be dated to the reign of King Jehoiakim in "the late Babylonian period shortly before the exile", which occurred in 587 or 586 BCE. They identify verses 5 and 9 as glosses which "give a reason for the imprecation upon enemies (verse 5) and a liturgical petition for salvation (verse 9)".

Verse 5 
 Because they regard not the works of the Lord, nor the operation of his hands.

In Psalm 28:5 is, according to Charles Spurgeon's exegesis, an example of general revelation: with God's hand clearly seen in nature and history. God works in creation: nature teems with proofs of his wisdom and goodness, yet atheists refuse to see him: he works in providence, ruling and overruling, and his hand is manifest in human history.<ref>Spurgeon, C., [https://www.biblestudytools.com/commentaries/treasury-of-david/psalms-28-5.html The Treasury of David: Psalm 28]</ref>

 Verse 8 
 The LORD is their strength, and he is the saving strength of his anointed.
The Jerusalem Bible suggests that the word "anointed" here refers to the people of God consecrated to his service, and not the king or the high priest.

Uses

Judaism
Verse 9 is the first verse of the paragraph Hoshia Et Amecha of Pesukei Dezimra. This verse, because of its 10 words, is often used for counting for the ten people needed for a minyan, as Jewish law forbids the numerical counting of people.

Book of Common Prayer
In the Church of England's Book of Common Prayer, this psalm is appointed to be read on the evening of the fifth day of the month.

Musical settings 
A setting of Psalm 28 in English, "Thou art, O Lord, my strength and stay", by John Bennet was published in Richard Langdon's Divine Harmony in 1774. Heinrich Schütz wrote a setting of a paraphrase of the psalm in German, "Ich ruf zu dir, Herr Gott, mein Hort", SWV 125, for the Becker Psalter, published first in 1628. Felix Mendelssohn used verse 1 of Psalm 28 for a recitative in his oratorio Elijah, first performed in 1846. Alan Hovhaness set verses 1, 2, and 9 for his choir and organ work Unto Thee Will I Cry, op. 162.

References

External links

 
 
  in Hebrew and English - Mechon-mamre
 Text of Psalm 28 according to the 1928 Psalter
 Of David. / To you, LORD, I call; my Rock, do not be deaf to me text and footnotes, usccb.org United States Conference of Catholic Bishops
 Psalm 28:1 introduction and text, biblestudytools.com
 Psalm 28 – Praise from Prayer Heard and Answered enduringword.com
 Psalm 28 / Refrain: The Lord is my strength and my shield. Church of England
 Psalm 28 at biblegateway.com
 Hymns for Psalm 28 hymnary.org

6th-century BC literature
028
Works attributed to David